Super Rub 'a' Dub is a downloadable game on the PlayStation Store for the PlayStation 3 video game console.  It was announced on February 8, 2007 at the D.I.C.E. Summit, and released in North America on April 19, 2007 alongside a demo version.

In 2012, the game received an unexpected boost in popularity when YouTube user Videogamedunkey created a parodic fake trailer for the game titled Bubberducky that would later amass more than 3,300,000 views.

Gameplay 
Super Rub 'a' Dub stars the yellow duck from the Ducks demo for the PlayStation 3 that was shown at E3 2005 and 2006. Using the motion-sensing functions of a SIXAXIS or DualShock 3 controller, the player tilts a bathtub filled with water to move a rubber duck around the tub. There are many obstacles to avoid, such as falling out of the tub, and toy sharks which will try to eat the smaller ducks. Online leaderboards track users' fastest times, and allow users to see the replays of those fastest times. The game has three difficulty settings: "Fun", "Tricky", and "Tough". Each of the difficulty settings have 20 levels that the player is required to complete in order to proceed to the next difficulty.

In August 2008, version update 3.00 was released. This update added 9 additional ducks to unlock, monthly leaderboards, and an online store.

External links 
D.I.C.E. 07: Phil Harrison speaks - PlayStation 3 News at GameSpot

2007 video games
Puzzle video games
PlayStation 3 games
PlayStation 3-only games
PlayStation Network games
Sony Interactive Entertainment games
Video games developed in the United Kingdom
Sumo Digital games